Josia similis is a moth of the  family Notodontidae. It is only known from north-eastern Brazil.

External links
Species page at Tree of Life project

Notodontidae of South America
Moths described in 1925